Dortmund is a city in Germany.

The word may also refer to:

Borussia Dortmund, colloquially "Dortmund", the city's leading sport club
Dortmund (horse), American Thoroughbred racehorse named after the sport club Dortmund
Dortmund, the code word radioed by Germany to initiate the 1941 Operation Barbarossa campaign against the Soviet Union